Tami Show was a pop rock band that originated from Chicago, Illinois in 1987.

History 
The group took its name from a 1964 concert film. The six-member ensemble (including sisters Cathy and Claire Massey on vocals) released an album on Chrysalis Records in 1988 and a second on RCA Records in 1991; they are best remembered for their US top 40 hit "The Truth".

Claire Massey continues to record solo material and maintains a website under the name "Planet Claire".

Members
Cathy Massey: vocals/guitar
Claire Massey: vocals
Tommy Gawenda: guitar
Peter Spero: keyboards (1987-1991)
George McCrae: keyboards (1991-1992)
Mark Jiaras: bass
Ken Harck: drums

Discography
Tami Show (Chrysalis Records, 1988)
Wanderlust (RCA Records, 1991)

Singles
"She's Only Twenty" (Billboard Hot 100 peak #88, 1988)
"The Truth" (Billboard Hot 100 peak #28, 1991)
"Did He Do It To You" (did not chart, 1991)

Contributions
Claire Massey and Cathy Massey are backup singers on the song "I'm A Wimp" from the Steve Dahl album Pet Fishsticks.

References

Musical groups from Chicago